Tordoki Yani or Tardoki Yani is the highest peak of the Sikhote-Alin Mountains. It is located in the southeast of Khabarovsk Krai to the north of the border of Primorsky Krai. It is a table mountain and rises to an elevation of 2,090 m (2077 at GSE). The mountain is the source of the river Anyuy.

See also
List of ultras of Northeast Asia

Notes

Mountains of Khabarovsk Krai
Sikhote-Alin